Poretsky (masculine), Poretskaya (feminine), or Poretskoye (neuter) may refer to:

Places
Poretsky District, a district of the Chuvash Republic, Russia
Poretsky (rural locality) (Poretskaya, Poretskoye), several rural localities in Russia

People
Ignace Poretsky, one of the nicknames of Ignace Reiss (1899–1937), Soviet spy
Leonid Poretsky (b. 1954), American endocrinologist
Platon Poretsky (1846–1907), Russian astronomer, mathematician, and logician